The 1886 Massachusetts gubernatorial election was held on November 2, 1886. Incumbent Republican Governor George D. Robinson did not run for re-election to a fourth term in office. He was succeeded by his Lt. Governor Oliver Ames, who defeated Democratic former State Senator John F. Andrew.

General election

Results

See also
 1886 Massachusetts legislature

References

Governor
1886
Massachusetts
November 1886 events